Núria Pradas i Andreu (born 1 September 1954) is a Spanish Catalan philologist and writer. She began her literary career in the field of children's and youth literature. She is the author of an extensive literary production in this field as well as in adult fiction.

Biography
Núria Pradas i Andreu was born in Barcelona, 1 September 1954, in neighborhood of El Poblenou. Her love of reading led her to study Catalan Philology at the University of Barcelona, graduating in 1980. Immediately, she began working there as a Catalan Language and Literature teacher. It was in Sant Feliu de Llobregat, where she lived for a long time, that her career began in amateur theatre, specifically in the  company, which served as an experience for her to later direct youth theater groups and also to write her own plays. She also collaborated with Borràs in the theater group L'Ull de Bou of Sant Esteve Sesrovires.

From theater, she moved on to narrative and in 1995, she published her first book, Sol d'hivern, with which she began her career in children's and youth literature. In 2014, she published her first novel for adults, La Noia de la Biblioteca, which was followed by Somnis a mida (2016), translated into more than ten languages, and L'aroma del temps (2018).

In 2020, she won the Ramon Llull Novel Award with Tota una vida per recuerdo, a novel set in the U.S. during the 1930s, focused on the world of cartoons. Among her latest youth novels, can be noted, Ella (2020) and El cant del cigne (2022), while her latest novel for an adult audience is La vida secreta de Sylvia Nolan  (Ed. Fate, 2022).

Awards and honours 

 Premio Ferran Canyameres for Parella de Dames (1996)
 Premio Carmesina for La Princesa Pomèlia (1998)
 Premio Ciutat d'Olot for A carn, a carn! (2002)
 Premio Agna Canalies Mestres (2009)
 Premio Carlemany (2012)
 Premio Ramon Llull for Tota una vida per recordar (2020)

Selected works

Children's and youth literature 
 1995: Sol d'hivern, Ed. Baula
 1995: Lior, Ed. Cruïlla
 1995: L'extraordinària píndola rosa, Ed. Cruïlla
 1996: La batalla de la sopa, Ed. Baula
 1996: Un estiu amb l'Anna, Ed. Cruïlla
 1996: Posa una tieta Adela a la teva vida, Ed. Baula
 1996: Parella de dames, Ed. Baula
 1997: Algú ha vist en Puck?, Ed. Cruïlla
 1998: Simfonia per a un segrest, Ed. Alfaguara
 1998: La vareta Boja, Ed. Cruïlla
 1998: La princesa Pomèlia, Ed. del Bullent
 1998: La tieta Adela del Nil, Ed. Baula
 1999: Laura, Ed. Cruïlla
 1999: Els iungs, Ed. La Galera
 1999: Ai, Antonia o t'has ficat?, Ed. Baula
 2000: L'IJ a la recerca de la iaia perduda, Ed. Alfaguara
 2000: Diaris de campaments, Ed. Casals
 2000: L'Intrús, Ed. Cruïlla
 2001: Embolic al món del no-res, Ed. La Galera
 2002: La serpent de plomes, Ed. Cruïlla
 2002: La tieta Adela a Nova York, Ed. Baula
 2002: A carn, a carn!, Ed. La Galera
 2003: La Pipa ha perdut la son, Ed. Cruïlla
 2004: L'últim refugi, Ed. Alfaguara
 2005: Això no mola, Escarola!, Ed. Barcanova
 2005: Curs per a joves detectius, Ed. La Galera
 2005: Curs per a joves genets de dracs, Ed. La Galera
 2005: Manhattan, Ed. Baula
 2006: Curs per a joves patges reials, Ed. La Galera
 2006: Misteri al carrer de les Glicines, Ed. Bambú
 2006: La tieta Adela a Sevilla, Ed. Baula
 2006: Curs per a joves fades bones, Ed. La Galera
 2006: Una nit de reis boja, Ed. La Galera
 2007: Quina família!, Ed. La Galera
 2008: Postals en sèpia, Ed. Planeta
 2009: Paraules figurades, Ed. Barcanova. Col. “Mots Vius”
 2009: Els secrets de la vida, Ara Editorial
 2010: : La bruixeta Encantada i l'escombra Primmirada, Ed. Alfaguara
 2010: Sant Jordi i el drac, Ed. Barcanova, Col. El Petit Univers
 2010: Heka, un viatge màgic a Egipte. Ed. Bambú
 2010: La colla de les mofetes, Ed. Barcanova
 2011: Raidho, Ed. Bambú
 2011: La tieta Adela a Venècia, Ed. Baula
 2011: Lulú Pecas: Un secreto secretísimo, Ed. Medialive
 2011: Lulú Pecas: Aventura en el colegio, Ed. Medialive
 2011: Lulú Pecas: Lulú y su superequipo, Ed. Medialive
 2011: Lulú Pecas: Un cumpleaños muy molón, Ed. Medialive
 2012: : Lulú se pone estupenda, Ed. Medialive
 2012. Koknom, Ed. Bambú
 2014: Els desastrosos encanteris de la bruixa Serafina, Ed. Bambú
 2014: Abril és nom de Primavera, Ed. Animallibres
 2014: Felipe Qué Flipe y el Supermóvil, Ed. RBA
 2014: Felipe qué Flipe en tierra de dinosaurios, Ed. RBA
 2014: Black soul, Ed. Bambú
 2016: La filla de l'argenter, Ed. Animallibres
 2020: Ella, ed. Bambú
 2022: El cant del cigne, ed. Bambú

Crossover literature (for all audiences)
 2012: El perfum de les llimones, Món Abacus
 2013: Sota el mateix cel, Ed. Columna
 2014: Nebbia, Ed. Bromera
 2020: La marca del lleó, Ed. Fanbooks (with Glòria Sabaté)

Novels 
 2014: La noia de la biblioteca, Ed. Columna
 2016: Somnis a mida, Ed. Columna.
 2017: La pintora del barret de palla, Ed. Edafós
 2017: L'aroma del temps
 2020: Tota una vida per recordar
 2022: La vida secreta de la Sylvia Nolan

Translations 
 2009: Ferotge, el Cavernícola, Ed. La Galera (French translation)
 2011: Dani Bocafoc (1 i 2), Ed. La Galera (Spanish translation)
 2012: Vordak, L'Ultramalvat, Ed. La Galera (Spanish translation)
 2012: L'inspector Gadget, Ed. La Galera
 2012: Johnny Test, Ed. La Galera

Easy reading adaptations for 
 El libro de la Selva
 Dràcula
 El gos dels Baskerville
 Orgullo y perjuicio
 Grandes esperanzas

References

1954 births
Living people
Writers from Barcelona
Spanish children's writers
21st-century Spanish writers
21st-century Spanish women writers
Spanish women children's writers
21st-century Spanish novelists
Spanish women novelists
Catalan-language writers